Dicyrtoma is a genus of globular springtails in the family Dicyrtomidae. There are at least 30 described species in Dicyrtoma.

Species

References

springtail genera